The 2020 Washington Huskies football team represented the University of Washington during the 2020 NCAA Division I FBS football season. The team was led by first-year head coach Jimmy Lake. The Huskies played their home games at Husky Stadium in Seattle, Washington, and competed in the North Division of the Pac-12 Conference.

On August 11, 2020, the Pac-12 canceled all fall sports competitions due to the COVID-19 pandemic. On September 24, the Pac-12 announced that football teams would return to play a seven-game conference-only season beginning on November 6, with the conference championship game scheduled for December 18.

The Huskies finished atop the North Division after canceling their game against Oregon, compiling a 3–1 record. On December 14, the Pac-12 announced that the Huskies would not play in the 2020 Pac-12 Football Championship Game, due to "neither having the minimum 53 scholarship student-athletes available for the game nor the minimum number of scholarship student-athletes at a position group" because of the COVID-19 pandemic. On December 18, the Huskies announced that they would not pursue a bid to a bowl game.

Previous season
Chris Petersen coached his final game against Boise State before retiring at the end of the 2019 season. The Huskies finished 8–5 in 2019, 4–5 in conference play, in a three-way tie for 2nd place in the North Division.

Offseason

Position key

Offseason departures

Recruiting

Transfers

Returning starters

Preseason

Award watch lists

Pac-12 media days
The Preseason Media poll will be released prior to the start of the regular season.

Preseason All-Pac-12 teams
First Team

Second Team

Personnel

Coaching staff

Roster

As of November 2, 2020

Depth chart

Schedule

Regular season
Washington's 2020 regular season was announced on January 16. The Huskies had a game scheduled against Michigan on September 5, which was later canceled before the start of the 2020 season. The Huskies canceled their other two non-conference games, scheduled against Sacramento State and Utah State, shortly thereafter due to the Pac-12 Conference's decision to play a conference-only schedule due to the COVID-19 pandemic. The seven game Conference only schedule was announced October 3, 2020.

Game summaries

at California

Game canceled due to Cal not having the minimum number of scholarship players available for the game as a result of a positive football student-athlete COVID-19 cases.

Oregon State

Arizona

at Washington State

Game canceled due to Washington State not having the minimum number of scholarship players available for the game as a result of a positive football student-athlete COVID-19 cases.

Utah

Due to Arizona State not having the minimum number of scholarship players available due to positive COVID-19 tests Utah was rescheduled to play at Washington. Trailing 21–0 at halftime, Washington scored 24 unanswered points for the eventual 24–21 victory. It has been Washington's largest come-from-behind win since a 1988 game against California.

Stanford

at Oregon

Game canceled due to UW not having the minimum number of scholarship players available for the game as a result of a positive football student-athlete COVID-19 cases.

Pac-12 Championship Game at USC

Game canceled due to Washington not having the minimum number of scholarship players available for the game as a result of a positive football student-athlete COVID-19 cases. Oregon replaced Washington in the title game

Rankings

Statistics

Awards and honors

Pac-12 Player of the Week

Athlon Sports National Player of the Week

Players drafted into the NFL

References

Washington
Washington Huskies football seasons
Washington Huskies football
Washington Huskies football